Jay Powell may refer to: 

Jay Powell (baseball player) (born 1972), American baseball player
Jay Powell (politician) (1952-2019), member of the legislature of the U.S. State of Georgia
Jerome Powell (born 1953), 16th chair of the U.S. Federal Reserve